An optic (not to be confused with optics, the science of light) is a colloquial abbreviation of optical instrument, a device that changes the behavior or properties of light.  A Fresnel lens, used in lighthouses, is a type of optic. 

Optic may also refer to:
 Optic, an alcoholic spirits measure, a device for dispensing fixed amounts of alcoholic spirits
 Optic, a barley (Hordeum vulgare) cultivar
 OpTic Gaming, an American esports organization

OPTIC can refer to :
 Optimized Protocol for Transport of Images to Clients used by iCentrix's MarioNet split web browser
 OPTICS algorithm, an unsupervised learning clustering algorithm

Optics can refer to:
 In Public relations, a neologistic term for the way something will be perceived